Tinnelva is a river in Notodden, Vestfold og Telemark, Norway. It flows from Lake Tinn to Heddalsvatnet.

References

Notodden
Rivers of Vestfold og Telemark